Natasha Thomas (born 27 September 1986) is a Danish singer and songwriter.

Career
In 2003, at the age of 16, Thomas released her debut single "Why (Does Your Love Hurt So Much)", which reached number 40 on the German chart.

"Save Your Kisses For Me" was released at the beginning of June 2004, meeting great success, while her second single "It's Over Now" reached number 12 on the charts. The mid-tempo love song, which features the Tobagonian reggae artist Sugar Daddy, also made it into the top 20 of the airplay charts.

Thomas was later selected to represent one of the world's best-known and most important fashion labels, "Lacoste". As the new worldwide face of "Lacoste", Thomas was seen from May 2004 onwards in a pan-European print and television campaign alongside French tennis player Arnaud Clément. The advert was directed by Bruno Aveillan.

Thomas was also seen worldwide in the Lacoste's Touch of Pink fragrance print and TV ads. One of Thomas's song fragments that appeared in the TV ads was "Let Me Show You (The Way)".  Touch of Pink won two FiFi Awards in Berlin in April 2005, including "People's Choice' Award for Women".

Later, Thomas broke her worldwide recording contract with Sony Music and started her own record company along with her management crew. The result of this new artistic choice was her second album "Playin' With Fire", released in 2006 and re-issued the following year to include the single "Real".

Save Your Kisses, Natasha Thomas' first album was a minor hit in some South America Countries, such as Argentina and Brazil (where it was released by Epic Records in 2004). Thomas' song "It's Over Now" was included on the Brazilian soap opera "Senhora do Destino" (English: "The Owner of Destiny") international soundtrack. Her second album "Playin' With Fire", was not released there.

In 2021, Thomas has completed an AP Degree in Multimedia Design & Communication, as well as a Bachelor’s Degree in Social Education. She continues to work on various creative projects and has also done some acting jobs.

Discography

Studio albums

Singles

Promotional singles

References

External links
 
 Interview with Natasha Thomas: "Denmark is different" (German, sbznet.de)

1986 births
21st-century Danish women  singers
Danish dance musicians
Danish pop singers
Danish women singer-songwriters
English-language singers from Denmark
Living people
People from Roskilde
Singers from Copenhagen